Naresh Bhattarai (born 26 February), is a media personality, Chairman of Jay hos Media, Senior Radio Journalist, TV program producer, presenter from 1996 and popular lyricist with more than 300 songs recorded. Also, recognized script writer, actor who has contributed to numerous television commercials, feature films and music videos.

Acknowledged as ‘Voice of Nepal’ for being one of the most popular media personality. Awarded as the busiest Emcee for the year 2014 (for hosting the highest number stage shows and ceremonies)  and Emcee of the year 2016.

Media career

Senior program producer & presenter

Radio 
 Image FM 97.9 : 2002 to till date

 Subha Din (the breakfast show)
 Cinema Bazar (Nepali Film Review show)
 Show Case (Nepali Film Review show)

Television 
 Terai Television (TTV) : 2009 to 2016

 Love and Life (talk show that features respected and popular figures )
 Entertainment Weekly’ (EW) (full-fledged entertainment show )
 Shake Hands -  Personal Reconnect Show

 Prime Times HD : 2020 to till date

 "Mero Eauta Sathi chha"

 Jay Hos Media 

 "Chiyapaan with Naresh" : 2019 to till date

 Image khabar 
 "The Evening Guff With Naresh"

 Galaxy 4K 

 Intra Foundation's MERO DANCE CUP USA 2022 ( Dance Reality Show ): 2022 to till date

Career 

 Program presenter at Image Channel, 2009 -2010
 Program presenter for Nepal’s first News FM, Image News FM 103.6, 2008 to 2010
 Acted as a model for numerous Television Commercials since 2007
 Lead actor for mega serial ‘Gahana’, 2005
 Acted in more than 12 feature films in various roles since 2005
 Program Presenter for FM Adhyatma Jyoti 100 MHz, 1996
 Program coordinator and presenter, Image FM 100 MHz, 1997-1999
 Program coordinator and presenter, Classic FM 100 MHz, 1999-2002
 Program presenter for first ever dance reality show ‘Aagan’ in "Nepal Television", 1999-2004
 Acted in many music videos as an artist since 2002

Solo albums 
 Haraf
 Height

Discography

As a lyricist 

 Timi Nai Hau 
 Kati Maya
 Mann Nai Timro Badaliyasi
 Selly I Love You
 Dil Ko Dhoka
 Mann Mero Mann
 Hey Maya
 Timi Nai Hau Priye
 Aafnai Chhaya Le
 Kehi Kura Ma Bhaanchhu
 Duniya Yastai Rahechha
 Jay Shree Ram
 Jalay Ma Jalay
 Soltini
 Maile Jati Maya
 Ma ta Sojhi Sojhi
 Shiraima Shirbandi
 Lamo Bato
 Kina Aattinu

As an actor 
 "Bato ko kaada" 
 "Naboli Jitchhau Timi"
 "Jhan Jhan Maya Badyo"
 "Timro Yaad Bhulauna"
 "Timilai Hongkong purayo"
 "Nisturile Chhadera gai hali"

As a Poet 

 Ma Achel prem maa pareko chu
 Lockdown Zindagi
 K herera baschau ajhai
 Timi ta neta bhayechau
 Sansarei jitna sakchu ma timi sangha harchu ma
 Ma sakchu jitna harek baji

Filmography

Script Writer

As lyricist

Awards 
 "Voice of Nepal" awarded by Kalash Events in the year 2014
 "Best Lyricist" award for the song in feature film "Dhoowa yo Nasha" in the year 2013
 "Film Journalist Award 2008" by "Film Journalist Association of Nepal"
 "Youth Ambassador for Peace" by Youth Federation for World Peace in 2008
 "Popular Emcee of the Year 2014" by Box office film club
 "Emcee of the Year 2016" by 1st Nepali Music Video Award, UAE
 "Best Lyricist" award for the song "Su swagatam" sung by Anil Singh, awarded by 3rd Nepali Music Video Award 2018, Malaysia
 "National Film Journalism Award 2075" by Film Journalist Association Nepal ( चलचित्र पत्रकार संघ नेपालबाट "राष्ट्रिय चलचित्र पत्रकारिता सम्मान २०७५" )
 "Special Award" awarded by 10th NEFTA Film Awards 2077 
 "Sarlahi Golden Honor 2077" from Barhathwa Municipality (बरहथवा नगरपालिकाबाट "सर्लाही स्वर्णिम सम्मान २०७७")

References

External links 
 
 
 Official Website
 Commercial Ad 
 Filmy Khabar 
 Voice Of Nepal Honors Naresh Bhattarai
 Image FM 97.9 Profile
 Raato Ghar | Press Show by Naresh Bhattarai
 Samaya Sandarva by Naresh Bhattarai
 Jhankar Sangeet Sambaat with Naresh Bhattarai 
 Naresh Bhattarai UK Special 2016 "Happy Days"
 Article on Naresh Bhattarai
 Naresh Bhattarai at Sutra Talk Show
 बिहेपछी श्रीमतीले फिल्म नखेल्नुको कारण, संचारकर्मी नरेश भट्टराईका आन्तरिक कुरा खोतल्दै अनुप भट्टराई
 बोलेरै मासिक दश लाख कमाउँछन् नरेश, चर्चित नायिकासँग थियो यिनको प्रेम
 Naresh Bhattarai बने अन्तराष्ट्रिय उद्घोषक,चल्तिका हिरोभन्दा बढी कमाउँछन्
 Sugarika KC and Naresh Bhattarai,THE EVENING SHOW AT SIX, Himalaya TV
 TEAM SELFIE QUEEN NARESH BHATTARAI, ANIL SINGH AND RABINA THAPA, THE EVENING SHOW AT SIX, Himalaya TV

Living people
1978 births
People from Sarlahi District
Nepalese songwriters
Nepalese Hindus
Nepalese people